David Watters may refer to:
 David E. Watters (1944-2009), American educator
 David H. Watters (born 1950), New Hampshire politician